Julie Claire Hesmondhalgh (born 25 February 1970) is an English actress and narrator. She is known for her role as Hayley Cropper in the ITV soap opera Coronation Street between 1998 and 2014. For this role, she won Best Serial Drama Performance at the 2014 National Television Awards and Best Actress at the 2014 British Soap Awards.

Hesmondhalgh's other regular television roles include Cucumber (2015), Happy Valley (2016), Broadchurch (2017) and The Pact (2021). Her stage credits include God Bless the Child at the Royal Court Theatre in London (2014), and Wit at the Royal Exchange, Manchester (2016).

Early life
Hesmondhalgh was born in Accrington, Lancashire. She applied to drama school aged 18, and studied at the London Academy of Music and Dramatic Art from 1988 to 1991 (one of her classmates was Benito Martinez). On finishing her training, Hesmondhalgh was a part of Arts Threshold, a small independent theatre in London, for several years, and worked with Rufus Norris in his directorial debut. In the 1990s, she appeared in such television dramas as The Bill, Catherine Cookson's The Dwelling Place, and in the Victoria Wood comedic television movie Pat and Margaret.

Career

Television
Hesmondhalgh is best known for playing Hayley Cropper in the ITV soap opera Coronation Street. Making her debut appearance on the show in January 1998, she played the first transgender character in a British soap opera. She took maternity leave from the soap between 2000 and 2001 after the birth of her first daughter. After nearly ten years on the show, Hesmondhalgh decided to take another break for a year in order to spend more time with her family. She left on 22 October 2007 and returned on 17 November 2008. On 24 December 2011, Hesmondhalgh appeared on ITV's The Cube, winning £20,000 for her Accrington-based anti-poverty charity, Maundy Relief.

Hesmondhalgh's character Hayley was involved in high-profile storylines, including one concerning a gender transition, and a hostage storyline in the Underworld factory in which Hayley and Carla Connor (Alison King) were kidnapped, bound and gagged by rogue businessman Tony Gordon, who intended to murder them. They escaped unharmed, although Tony was killed in the ensuing explosion. On 11 January 2013, ITV announced that Hesmondhalgh would be leaving Coronation Street in January 2014 after 15 years on the show, and that her character Hayley was to leave in a controversial right-to-die storyline, following a battle with pancreatic cancer. Hesmondhalgh filmed her final scenes on 18 November 2013; they were broadcast on 22 January 2014, the night she won a National Television Award for Best Performance in a Serial Drama, which she shared with her longtime co-star, David Neilson. Over 10 million viewers tuned in to Hayley's final episode, where she ended her life. She worked with pancreatic cancer charities to raise awareness of the disease, and was involved in a petition and attended a parliamentary debate on the subject in 2014.

From 22 January 2015, Hesmondhalgh played the role of Cleo Whitaker in the Channel 4 drama series Cucumber, written by Russell T Davies. She also appeared in the BBC Four film Black Roses: The Killing of Sophie Lancaster, a television film about the murder of Sophie Lancaster. Hesmondhalgh played the role of Sophie's mother, Sylvia Lancaster, a role which she previously portrayed on stage. Hesmondhalgh is friends with Sylvia Lancaster and patron of the Sophie Lancaster Foundation. In 2015, Hesmondhalgh won a Royal Television Society Award for Best Female Actor in a Drama for her role as Sylvia.

In 2015, Hesmondhalgh appeared in an episode of the BBC drama Moving On, with Shane Richie and John Thomson, as well as the one episode of Inside No 9, written by Steve Pemberton and Reece Shearsmith.

In 2016, Hesmondhalgh joined the cast of acclaimed drama thriller Happy Valley for its second series on BBC One. She was offered the role by creator, writer and executive producer Sally Wainwright. Hesmondhalgh's character Amanda Wadsworth, is a midwife and working mother from Yorkshire who has a fraught relationship with her husband, John (Kevin Doyle).

In 2017, Hesmondhalgh played the role of rape victim Trish in the third and final series of Broadchurch on ITV.

In 2018, Hesmondhalgh was announced as a guest star in the Doctor Who episode "Kerblam!".

In 2019, Hesmondhalgh played Amanda in the first episode of the final season of Channel 4's Catastrophe with Rob Delaney and Sharon Horgan. In March 2019, it was announced that Hesmondhalgh would be appearing in a new six part ITV comedy drama, The Trouble with Maggie Cole, with Dawn French.

In 2019 Methuen Drama published her Working Diary as part of their Theatre Makers series. She is, with writer Becx Harrison and visual artist Grant Archer, co-founder of Take Back, a Manchester-based theatre collective dedicated to making script in hand rapid responses to social and political events.

In 2020, Hesmondhalgh played Heather in the third series of The A Word. In May 2021, Hesmondhalgh played Nancy in the BBC1 series The Pact, alongside Laura Fraser, Rakie Ayola, Eiry Thomas, Aneurin Barnard and Jason Hughes. The series, set in Wales, was written by Pete McTighe.

In 2021, Hesmondhalgh started narrating the revival of The Weakest Link, taking over from Jon Briggs.

Stage
From 19–29 September 2012, Hesmondhalgh appeared at the Royal Exchange Theatre in Manchester, portraying Sylvia Lancaster in Black Roses: The Killing of Sophie Lancaster opposite Rachel Austin. The play was based on the real-life story of Sylvia's late daughter, Sophie Lancaster. Hesmondhalgh won a Manchester Theatre Award for Best Studio Performance in 2013.

On 23 January 2014, she returned to the Royal Exchange Theatre for her first role since leaving Coronation Street, in the Simon Stephens play Blindsided, which ran until 15 February that year. From 12 November to 20 December 2014, she appeared in God Bless The Child at the Royal Court Theatre in London, directed by Vicky Featherstone, playing Mrs Bradley, with Amanda Abbington.

In June 2015, Hesmondhalgh performed a script-in-hand scratch performance of her first one-woman play, These I Love, at Gulliver's in Manchester.

In January 2016, she played Vivian Bearing, an American Professor of Poetry dying of ovarian cancer, in Margaret Edson's Wit at The Royal Exchange main stage, directed by Raz Shaw, for which she was nominated for a TMA and won a Manchester Theatre Award for Best Actress.

She is a founder member of a Manchester-based grassroots theatre company creating work about social issues, Take Back, which she runs with Rebekah Harrison and Grant Archer, and to which she has contributed as a writer and actor. She is a member of The Gap collective, a new writing company in Manchester and performed their first gala performance at Halle St Peters in September 2015, in a piece by her husband Ian Kershaw.

On 30 April 2017, Hesmondhalgh starred in a one-off performance at the Royal Court Theatre, of Lemn Sissay's The Report, directed by John E. McGrath.

In February 2018, she starred as Renee in The Almighty Sometimes by Kendall Feaver. It was directed by Katy Rudd at the Royal Exchange.

In February 2019, she performed the title role in Mother Courage and Her Children by Bertolt Brecht, adapted by Anna Jordan. It was directed by Amy Hodge at the Royal Exchange, Manchester.

She is a supporter of Arts Emergency and a mentor with the National Youth Theatre.

Personal life
Hesmondhalgh is married to screenwriter Ian Kershaw. The couple live in Tameside with their two daughters.

Activism and fundraising
Hesmondhalgh is a Labour Party member. In August 2015, she endorsed Jeremy Corbyn's campaign in the Labour Party leadership election. She tweeted: "Proudly supporting Jeremy Corbyn in the Labour leadership contest." She campaigned for Corbyn as party leader in the 2017 UK general election. In May 2017, speaking at Labour's general election campaign launch in Manchester, she said: "I realised the Labour party and its core values would finally be in line with my own deeply held socialist beliefs about equality, justice and peace."

On 1 May 2013, Hesmondhalgh appeared on ITV game show All Star Mr & Mrs with husband Ian, and won £20,000 for Maundy Relief.

Hesmondhalgh is a patron of the following organisations: Trans Media Watch, Maundy Relief, Marple Drama, WAST, Manchester People's Assembly, Reuben's Retreat, The Alex Williams Believe and Achieve Trust, and The Sophie Lancaster Foundation (for whom she and Ian held a creative writing competition in schools across the North West in 2011). The latter organisation was set up following the murder of Sophie Lancaster.

In 2019, she set up the group 500 Acts of Kindness, a fundraising community where 500 members donate a pound a week to give to an individual, group, family or organisation in need.

Filmography

Awards and nominations

References

External links
 
 

1970 births
Living people
English humanists
English television actresses
English soap opera actresses
People from Accrington
Alumni of the London Academy of Music and Dramatic Art
Actresses from Lancashire
British LGBT rights activists
20th-century English actresses
21st-century English actresses
English stage actresses
Labour Party (UK) people